Christina Ricci (born February 12, 1980) is an American actress. Known for playing unusual characters with a dark edge, Ricci predominantly works in independent productions, but has also appeared in numerous box office hits. She has received nominations for a Golden Globe and for two Primetime Emmy Awards.

Ricci made her film debut at the age of nine in Mermaids (1990), which was followed by a breakout role as Wednesday Addams in The Addams Family (1991) and its sequel, Addams Family Values (1993). Subsequent appearances in Casper and Now and Then (both 1995) established her as a teen idol. At 17, she moved into adult-oriented roles with The Ice Storm (1997), which led to parts in several independent films, such as Pecker (1998), The Opposite of Sex (1998), and Monster (2003). She has also starred in Sleepy Hollow (1999), 200 Cigarettes (1999), Penelope (2006), and Speed Racer (2008), and had a supporting role in The Matrix Resurrections (2021).

On television, Ricci appeared in the final season of Ally McBeal (2002), and had a guest role on Grey's Anatomy in 2006. She also starred in the ABC series Pan Am (2011–12), and produced and starred in the series The Lizzie Borden Chronicles (2015) and Z: The Beginning of Everything (2017). In 2021, she began starring in the critically acclaimed Showtime series Yellowjackets, and in 2022, she appeared in the comedy horror series Wednesday.

In 2010, Ricci made her Broadway debut in Time Stands Still. She is the national spokesperson for the Rape, Abuse & Incest National Network (RAINN). She is married and has two children.

Early life
Christina Ricci was born in Santa Monica, California, the youngest of four children of Sarah (née Murdoch) and Ralph Ricci. Her mother worked as a Ford Agency model during the 1960s and later became a real estate agent. Her father had a varied career, including jobs as a gym teacher, lawyer, drug counsellor, and primal scream therapist. Regarding her surname, Ricci has stated that she has Italian, Irish, and Scottish ancestry.

Ricci's family moved to Montclair, New Jersey, where she grew up attending Edgemont Elementary School, Glenfield Middle School, Montclair High School, and Morristown–Beard School. She later attended Professional Children's School in New York City. Her three older siblings are Rafael, Dante, and Pia. Ricci's parents separated when she was a preteen.  She has been vocal about her childhood in interviews, particularly her parents' divorce and turbulent relationship with her father.

Career

Beginnings and child stardom (1990–1996)

At the age of eight, Ricci was discovered by a local theater critic when she starred in a school production of The Twelve Days of Christmas. Another child was originally cast in the part, but Ricci devised a plan to secure the role for herself: She taunted her rival so much that he punched her. When she told on him, he lost the part. She recalled, "I've always been a really ambitious person. I guess that's the first time it really reared its ugly head". Soon thereafter, she featured in a pair of spoof commercials on Saturday Night Live. The first of these featured Ricci as a child at a birthday party in which medical waste fell out of a burst piñata, parodying the then-topical dumping of waste in the rivers of the United States' east coast. This gained Ricci her SAG-AFTRA card.

Ricci's big-screen debut was in the 1990 film Mermaids, as Cher's character's youngest daughter, Kate. She also appeared—alongside Cher and co-star Winona Ryder—in the music video for "The Shoop Shoop Song", which featured on the film's soundtrack. The following year, she starred as the morbidly precocious Wednesday Addams in Barry Sonnenfeld's The Addams Family, based on the cartoon of the same name. She reprised the role for the 1993 sequel, Addams Family Values. Both films were a commercial success, and critics singled out Ricci's performances as highlights.

Her next project, the live-action adaptation of Casper (1995), was her first in a lead role. The film received mixed reviews, but it was the eighth highest-grossing production of the year. Ricci at the time starred in the adventure film Gold Diggers: The Secret of Bear Mountain (1995), and as the younger version of Rosie O'Donnell's character, Roberta, in the coming-of-age drama Now and Then (1995). The latter is often cited as the "female version" of Stand by Me, and has gained a cult following since its release. She also had a supporting role in Bastard Out of Carolina (1996), which was the directorial debut of Anjelica Huston, whom Ricci had previously worked with on the Addams Family films.

Transition to adult roles (1997–1998)
In 1997, Ricci starred in the Disney remake of That Darn Cat, which was a moderate success at the box office. Later that year, she made a shift into "legitimate [...] adult roles" with her portrayal of the troubled, sexually curious Wendy Hood in Ang Lee's critically acclaimed art film, The Ice Storm. The part was originally given to Natalie Portman, who pulled out when her parents decided that the role was too provocative. In his review for Rolling Stone, Peter Travers wrote, "The sight of the [film's] young stars [...] fiddling with each other may shock '90s prudes, but Lee handles these moments with dry wit and compassion [...] The adolescent members of the cast do their characters proud, with Ricci a particular standout. Her wonderfully funny and touching performance, capturing the defiance and confusion that come with puberty, is the film's crowning glory".

Ricci had a small role in Terry Gilliam's offbeat road movie, Fear and Loathing in Las Vegas (1998), which marked her first collaboration with Johnny Depp. In 1998, she also had starring roles in three independent features—Buffalo '66, where she played Vincent Gallo's unwitting abductee-turned-love interest; John Waters' satirical comedy Pecker, as the hard-nosed girlfriend of Edward Furlong; and Don Roos' black comedy-drama The Opposite of Sex, playing the acid-tongued, manipulative Dede. For the latter, Ricci garnered critical acclaim and was nominated for a Golden Globe for Best Actress. Variety'''s Todd McCarthy described her as "deadly funny", and felt that she delivered her dialogue with "the skill of a prospective Bette Davis". Several years later, Entertainment Weekly singled out her portrayal of Dede as one of the "Worst Oscar Snubs Ever".

 Continued acclaim (1999–2004) 
In 1999, Ricci starred for a second time with Johnny Depp, in Tim Burton's gothic horror fantasy film Sleepy Hollow. The film was a commercial and critical success, and Ricci received a Saturn Award for her portrayal of Katrina Van Tassel. On December 4, 1999, Ricci appeared as the guest host on Saturday Night Live, and performed parodies of Britney Spears and the Olsen twins. During one of her skits, she accidentally punched actress Ana Gasteyer in the face. Other film appearances during this period included 200 Cigarettes (1999), Bless the Child (2000), and The Man Who Cried (2000; her third time working with Depp). She starred in Prozac Nation (2001), a drama based on Elizabeth Wurtzel's best-selling
memoir. The film—Ricci's first outing as a producer—received mixed reviews, but critics agreed that Ricci was the highlight, with Ed Gonzalez of Slant Magazine describing her as "splendid".

Ricci's next role was in The Laramie Project, a drama based on the murder of Matthew Shepard. The 2002 film, which premiered on HBO, received positive reviews from critics; TV Guide's Matt Roush praised the performances of the cast, while noting that the film's examination of homophobia could "enlighten" viewers. That same year, she starred with Kyle MacLachlan in the British comedy-thriller Miranda, and guest-starred on the fifth and final season of Ally McBeal, appearing as lawyer Liza Bump in seven episodes. Also, she produced and starred in Pumpkin, a black comedy about the relationship between a disabled young man and a sorority girl. In his review for The Chicago Sun-Times, Roger Ebert wrote, "Pumpkin is alive, and takes chances, and uses the wicked blade of satire in order to show up the complacent political correctness of other movies in its campus genre. It refuses to play it safe. And there is courage in the performances—for example [...] the way Ricci sails fearlessly into the risky material".

In 2003, Ricci took on the roles of a young girl wandering through England on foot in the British horror film The Gathering, the former girlfriend of an up-and-coming movie star enjoying all the perks of celebrity in Adam Goldberg's I Love Your Work, and that of a manipulative, vain, indecisive, vindictive, and neurotic girlfriend in Woody Allen's Anything Else, in which she starred with Jason Biggs. In his review of the latter, A. O. Scott of The New York Times described the film as an "antiromantic comedy", and said that Ricci played her role with "feral, neurotic glee".

Ricci starred opposite Charlize Theron in the biographical crime drama, Monster, also in 2003. Ricci's character—Selby Wall—was a fictionalized version of Tyria Moore, the real-life partner of serial killer Aileen Wuornos. Speaking of her decision to take the part, Ricci said it posed a challenge as it "goes completely against who I am [as a person]", and described the filming experience as "dark and depressing". The film was directed by Patty Jenkins and received rave reviews upon its release, with most critics directing their attention toward Theron, who went on to receive an Academy Award for her portrayal of Wuornos. She acknowledged Ricci during her acceptance speech, calling her the film's "unsung hero". Of Ricci's performance, Roger Ebert said, "[she] finds the correct note for Selby [...] so correct [that] some critics have mistaken it for bad acting, when in fact it is sublime acting in its portrayal of a bad actor. She plays Selby as clueless, dim, in over her head, picking up cues from moment to moment, cobbling her behavior out of notions borrowed from bad movies, old songs, and barroom romances. Selby must have walked into a gay bar for the first time only a few weeks ago, and studied desperately to figure out how to present herself. Selby and Aileen are often trying to improvise the next line they think the other wants to hear".

Film, television, and theater (2005–2010)
Ricci made a cameo appearance on Beck's 2005 album Guero, providing vocals for the track "Hell Yes". In 2005, Ricci starred in the Wes Craven horror film Cursed, which gained notoriety for its troubled production history, and in 2006, she appeared as a paramedic in two episodes of Grey's Anatomy, for which she was nominated for an Emmy Award in the category of Outstanding Guest Actress in a Drama Series. Ricci played the title character in Penelope (2006), a fantasy romantic comedy based on the legends of pig-faced women. The role required Ricci to wear a prosthetic nose; "We had a couple different noses that they tested at one point ... this really hideous, awfully unattractive snout ... then there was this really cute Miss Piggy snout ... we ended up meeting somewhere in the middle". Empire called the film a "lovely fairy tale," while Andrea Gronvall of The Chicago Reader felt it was "a worthy vehicle" for Ricci. Similarly, David Rooney of Variety felt that Ricci gave "the fanciful script more grounding than it might otherwise have had", and critic Eric D. Snider said it was "fun to see her in the most light-hearted role she's played since ... well, almost ever".

Her portrayal of nymphomaniac Rae in the 2006 drama Black Snake Moan, opposite Samuel L. Jackson, was particularly well received. She lost several pounds in order to make her character look "unhealthy". The film was deemed controversial because of its dark and exploitative themes, but critics felt that Ricci was impressive. Writing for Film Comment, Nathan Lee described her performance as "fearless, specific, and blazingly committed", adding, "She's the white-hot focal point of [director] Brewer's loud, brash, encompassing vision". Ricci appeared alongside Jackson for the second time in another 2006 film, Home of the Brave, an ensemble drama following the lives of four soldiers in Iraq and their return to the United States.

Ricci played the girlfriend of the titular character in Speed Racer (2008), a US$120 million adaptation of the Japanese anime and manga series of the same name. The film, which was directed by the Wachowskis, received mixed reviews upon release and was deemed a financial failure; however, it has since been reappraised as a "masterpiece" by some critics. She also appeared in a segment of the 2008 anthology film New York, I Love You, with Orlando Bloom.

In 2009, Ricci guest-starred in three episodes of TNT's Saving Grace, during its second season, as a detective who teams up with lead character Grace, played by Holly Hunter. Also in 2009, she appeared alongside Liam Neeson in the psychological thriller After.Life and made her Broadway theatre debut as Mandy in Donald Margulies' play Time Stands Still, opposite Laura Linney. Her first public performance was on September 23, 2010, at the Cort Theatre. She replaced Alicia Silverstone, who played Mandy during the play's initial run in 2009. The New York Times described Ricci as "confident" and "appealing".

Focus on television (2011–present)
Ricci played a kindhearted waitress in Bucky Larson: Born to Be a Star (2011), a comedy written by Adam Sandler. The film was universally panned by critics. Writing for Variety, Andrew Barker called it "one of the most astonishingly unfunny films of this or any other year", but commended Ricci, who he felt gave her role "more than it deserves". From 2011 to 2012, Ricci appeared as stewardess Maggie Ryan on the ABC drama series Pan Am, which was set in the 1960s and based on the iconic airline of the same name. The series garnered generally positive reviews, but, due to a decline in viewing figures during its initial run of 14 episodes, the producers decided not to proceed with a second season. In April 2012, Ricci returned to the stage, playing Hermia in an off-Broadway revival of Shakespeare's A Midsummer Night's Dream.

In 2012, Ricci also starred as a mistress alongside Robert Pattinson and Uma Thurman in the little-seen period film Bel Ami, based on the 1885 French novel of the same name, and in 2013, she headlined the Australian film Around The Block, as an American drama teacher who befriends an Aboriginal boy during the 2004 Redfern riots. She subsequently provided voices for the animated films The Smurfs 2 (2013) and The Hero of Color City (2014).

In 2014, Ricci played the title character in Lizzie Borden Took an Ax, a Lifetime film inspired by the true story of Borden, who was tried and acquitted of the murders of her father and stepmother in 1892, and in 2015 she reprised the role for the eight-part television series The Lizzie Borden Chronicles. The latter received generally positive reviews; Jane Borden of Vanity Fair called it "playful, wicked brain candy", adding that "Ricci was born to play [a] 19th-century ax murderer". Writing for The New York Times, Neil Genzlinger described Ricci as "gleeful and ruthless", while Keith Uhlich of The Hollywood Reporter felt that she and co-star Clea DuVall had "a delectable rapport not too far removed from Bette Davis and Joan Crawford at their hag-horror peak in What Ever Happened to Baby Jane?". Ricci went on to receive a nomination for the Screen Actors Guild Award for Outstanding Performance by an Actress in a Miniseries.

In 2016, Ricci played a woman who receives a life-changing revelation from the woman she thought was her sister in the independent drama Mothers and Daughters, as part of an ensemble cast, consisting of Sharon Stone, Susan Sarandon, Selma Blair, Mira Sorvino, and Courteney Cox. Ricci next starred in the 2017 Amazon Video miniseries Z: The Beginning of Everything, which presented a fictionalized version of the life of American socialite Zelda Fitzgerald. Ricci served as a producer on the series, which, she later acknowledged, is how she got the lead part; "I can tell you that in my experience, I have never, ever been cast in a role like this and I would never get this part normally ... I'm just not seen in that way. There are categories that people fall into, and types, and I was never a romantic lead. Basically, you couldn't get five people in a room to agree that I should be a romantic lead. I could get one person, but there's always more than one person whose opinion matters".

In the 2018 psychological thriller Distorted, Ricci starred opposite John Cusack as a woman suffering from bipolar disorder. The film received mixed reviews from critics, who cited Ricci's performance as a highlight.

Ricci began a series regular role on Showtime's Yellowjackets in 2021, for which she received a Primetime Emmy Award nomination.

On March 21, 2022, it was announced that Ricci was cast in Tim Burton's Wednesday as a series regular for Netflix. She plays Marilyn Thornhill, a botany teacher at Nevermore Academy.

Personal life

She has struggled with both anxiety and anorexia.

Ricci is listed in several art publications as one of artist Mark Ryden's muses. Her image has appeared in several of his oil paintings and sketches.

Ricci has eight tattoos on her body: a lion on her right shoulder blade (a reference to The Lion, the Witch and the Wardrobe, a favorite novel of hers as a child); an Edward Gorey figure on the inside of her right wrist; a pair of praying hands on her left hip (this tattoo was originally a bat); the name "Jack" on her right thigh for a deceased pet; a sparrow on her right breast; and a mermaid on her left ankle. She also had the words "Move or Bleed" on the left side of her rib cage, as well as a bouquet of sweet peas on her lower back.

Relationships and family
Ricci began dating comedian and actor Owen Benjamin in 2008 after they met on the set of the film All's Faire in Love. They became engaged in March 2009, but ended the engagement two months later.

In February 2013, Ricci announced her engagement to dolly grip James Heerdegen, whom she met while working on the series Pan Am in 2012. They married on October 26, 2013, in Manhattan. They have a son, born in August 2014. On July 2, 2020, Ricci filed for divorce after almost seven years of marriage. In her divorce filing, Ricci stated that she was subjected to "severe physical and emotional abuse" by Heerdegen and that "many of these acts of abuse" took place in front of their son. The Los Angeles Police Department had previously responded to a call at Ricci and Heerdegen's Woodland Hills, California home on June 25, 2020. Heerdegen was not arrested, but Ricci was granted an emergency protective order against Heerdegen the day before she filed for divorce. The order prohibited any contact between the couple. In January 2021, Ricci was granted a domestic violence restraining order against Heerdegen. In April 2021, Ricci was granted full custody of their son, while Heerdegen will have visitation rights.

In August 2021, Ricci and her boyfriend, hairstylist Mark Hampton, announced that she was pregnant with her second child. Two months later, on October 9, Ricci announced her marriage to Hampton. They welcomed their first child together, a daughter, in December 2021.

Activism

Ricci is the national spokesperson for the Rape, Abuse & Incest National Network (RAINN).

Due to fan backlash after PETA named Ricci on their Worst Dressed List for wearing fur, Ricci announced she would stop wearing fur; PETA subsequently removed her from their list.

Filmography
Film

Television

Other works

Music
 2005: "Hell Yes" – Beck

Music videos
 1990: "The Shoop Shoop Song (It's in His Kiss)" – Cher
 1991: "Addams Groove" – MC Hammer
 1993: "Addams Family (Whoomp!)" – Tag Team
 2000: "Natural Blues" – Moby

Video games
 2008: The Legend of Spyro: Dawn of the Dragon as Cynder
 2008: Speed Racer: The Videogame as Trixie

Audiobooks
 Gossip Girl – Narrator
 Gossip Girl "You Know You Love Me" – Narrator
 Little Women – Narrator

Scripted podcasts
 Harley Quinn & The Joker: Sound Mind'' - Harleen Quinzel/Harley Quinn

Awards and nominations

References

External links

 
 

1980 births
Living people
Actresses from Santa Monica, California
Actresses from New Jersey
People from Montclair, New Jersey
American child actresses
American film actresses
American people of Italian descent
American people of Scotch-Irish descent
American television actresses
American voice actresses
Sexual abuse victim advocates
Montclair High School (New Jersey) alumni
Morristown-Beard School alumni
20th-century American actresses
21st-century American actresses